The Dow Jones Industrial Average, an American stock index composed of 30 large companies, has changed its components 57 times since its inception, on May 26, 1896.  As this is a historical listing, the names here are the full legal name of the corporation on that date, with abbreviations and punctuation according to the corporation's own usage.  An up arrow ( ↑ ) indicates the company is added.  A down arrow ( ↓ ) indicates the company is removed.  A dagger ( † ) indicates a change of corporate name.

August 31, 2020

April 6, 2020 

United Technologies Corporation merged with Raytheon Company and new corporation entered index as Raytheon Technologies Corporation.

April 2, 2019

DowDuPont spun off DuPont and was replaced by Dow Inc.

June 26, 2018

February 1, 2018 

Wal-Mart Stores, Inc. was renamed Walmart Inc.

September 1, 2017 

DuPont merged with the Dow Chemical Company under the name DowDuPont.

March 19, 2015

September 23, 2013

September 24, 2012

June 8, 2009

September 22, 2008

February 19, 2008

November 21, 2005 

SBC Communications Inc. was renamed AT&T Inc. after it acquired the original AT&T.

April 8, 2004 

AT&T, Eastman Kodak, and International Paper were replaced by American International Group (AIG), Pfizer, and Verizon.

January 27, 2003 

Only name changes occurred. AlliedSignal Incorporated merged with and changed its name to Honeywell International. Exxon Corporation changed its name to Exxon Mobil Corporation upon merging with Mobil, J.P. Morgan & Company changed its name to JPMorgan Chase & Co., Minnesota Mining & Manufacturing changed its name to 3M Company, and Philip Morris Companies Inc. changed its name to Altria Group, Incorporated.

November 1, 1999 

Chevron, Goodyear, Sears Roebuck, and Union Carbide were replaced by Home Depot, Intel, Microsoft, and SBC Communications. Travelers and Citicorp merge under the name Citigroup.

March 17, 1997 

Bethlehem Steel, Texaco, Westinghouse, and Venator (then known as Woolworth;  name changed to Foot Locker in 2001) were replaced by Hewlett-Packard, Johnson & Johnson, Travelers Group, and Wal-Mart Stores.

May 6, 1991 

American Can, Navistar, and USX were replaced by Caterpillar, J.P. Morgan, and Walt Disney. American Telephone and Telegraph Company changed its name to AT&T Corporation.

March 12, 1987 

Inco and Owens-Illinois were replaced by Boeing and Coca-Cola. International Harvester changed its name to Navistar International Corporation and U.S. Steel changed its name to USX Corporation.

October 30, 1985 

American Tobacco and General Foods were replaced by McDonald's and Philip Morris. After merging with Signal Corp., Allied Chemical changed its name to Allied-Signal Incorporated and Standard Oil of California changed its name to Chevron Corporation.

August 30, 1982 

Johns-Manville was replaced by American Express.

June 29, 1979 

Chrysler and Esmark were replaced by IBM and Merck.

August 9, 1976 

Anaconda Copper was replaced by Minnesota Mining & Manufacturing. International Nickel changed its name to Inco, Swift & Company changed its name to Esmark, Standard Oil (NJ) changed its name to Exxon Corporation, United Aircraft changed its name to United Technologies Corporation.

June 1, 1959 

American Smelting, Corn Products, National Distillers, and National Steel were replaced by Aluminum Company of America, Anaconda Copper, Owens-Illinois, and Swift. Texas Company changed its name to Texaco Incorporated. Allied Chemical and Dye Corporation shortened its name to Allied Chemical Corporation.

July 3, 1956 

Loew's was replaced by International Paper.

March 4, 1939 

IBM and Nash Motors were replaced by AT&T and United Aircraft.

November 20, 1935 

Borden and Coca-Cola were replaced by DuPont and National Steel.

August 13, 1934 

United Aircraft was replaced by National Distillers.

August 15, 1933 

Drug Inc. and International Shoe were replaced by Corn Products Refining and United Aircraft.

May 26, 1932 

Hudson Motor, Liggett & Myers, Mack Truck, NCR, Paramount Publix, Radio Corp, Texas Gulf Sulphur and United Air Transport
replaced by
American Tobacco, Coca-Cola, Drug Inc., International Shoe, IBM, Loew's, Nash Motors, and Procter & Gamble.

July 18, 1930 

American Sugar, American Tobacco, Atlantic Refining, Curtiss-Wright, General Railway Signal, Goodrich, and Nash Motors
replaced by
Borden, Eastman Kodak, Goodyear, Hudson Motor, Liggett & Myers, Standard Oil of California, and United Air Transport.

January 29, 1930 

North American was replaced by Johns-Manville.

September 14, 1929 

Wright Aeronautical merged with the Curtiss Aeroplane and Motor Company to become Curtiss-Wright. Postum Inc. changed its name to General Foods.

January 8, 1929 

Victor Talking Machine was replaced by NCR.

October 1, 1928 

The index was expanded to thirty companies.
American Car and Foundry, American Locomotive, AT&T, United Drug, U.S. Rubber, and Western Union were replaced.
Atlantic Refining, Bethlehem Steel, Chrysler, General Railway Signal, Goodrich, International Nickel, Nash Motors, North American, Postum Incorporated, Radio Corporation of America, Standard Oil (NJ), Texas Gulf Sulphur, Union Carbide, Victor Talking Machine, Westinghouse Electric, and Wright Aeronautical were added.
Paramount Famous Lasky Corporation changed its name to Paramount Publix.

March 16, 1927 

Remington was replaced by United Drug.

December 31, 1925 

Kennecott was replaced by Remington.
Mack Trucks (stock dividend) was replaced by Mack Trucks (ex-stock dividend).

December 7, 1925 

U.S. Realty and Westinghouse Electric were replaced by Allied Chemical and Paramount.

August 31, 1925 

Anaconda Copper, Baldwin Locomotive, DuPont, Standard Oil of California, and Studebaker were replaced by General Motors, International Harvester, Kennecott, Texas Co., and U.S. Realty.

May 12, 1924 

Republic Iron was replaced by Woolworth.

February 6, 1924 

Utah Copper was replaced by Standard Oil, California.

January 22, 1924 

Central Leather, Corn Products, Goodrich, and Texas Co. were replaced by American Tobacco, DuPont, Mack Trucks, and Sears Roebuck.

March 1, 1920 

American Beet Sugar was replaced by Corn Products.

October 4, 1916 

The index was expanded to twenty companies.
General Motors, National Lead, Peoples Gas and U.S. Steel (Preferred) were removed.
American Beet Sugar, American Can, American Locomotive, AT&T, Baldwin Locomotive, Goodrich, Republic Iron, Studebaker, Texas Company, Utah Copper, Western Union, Westinghouse Electric were added.

July 29, 1915 

Amalgamated Copper reorganized under the name Anaconda Copper.

March 16, 1915 

U.S. Rubber (First Preferred) was replaced by General Motors.

May 12, 1912 

Colorado Fuel was replaced by Central Leather.

November 7, 1907 

Tennessee Coal was replaced by General Electric.

April 1, 1905 

U.S. Leather (Preferred) was replaced by U.S. Rubber (First Preferred).

July 1, 1901 

Continental Tobacco and International Paper
replaced by
American Car and Colorado Fuel

April 1, 1901 

American Cotton Oil, American Steel & Wire, Federal Steel, General Electric, and Pacific Mail Steamship
replaced by
Amalgamated Copper, American Smelting, International Paper, U.S. Steel, and U.S. Steel (Preferred).

April 21, 1899 

American Spirits, American Tobacco, Laclede Gas, and Standard Rope
replaced by
American Steel & Wire, Continental Tobacco, Federal Steel, and General Electric.

September 1, 1898 

General Electric was replaced by U.S. Rubber

March 24, 1898 

Peoples Gas absorbs Chicago Gas.

December 23, 1896 

U.S. Cordage was replaced by Standard Rope.

November 10, 1896 

U.S. Rubber was replaced by Pacific Mail Steamship.

August 26, 1896 

North American was replaced by U.S. Cordage. Distilling & Cattle Feeding changed its name to American Spirits Manufacturing.

May 26, 1896 
The First Dow Jones Industrial Average 

Only American Sugar carried over from the precursors.

Precursors to the DJIA 

Prior to the May 26, 1896,  inception of the Dow Jones Industrial Average, Charles Dow's stock average consisted of the Dow Jones Transportation Average. The average was created on July 3, 1884 by Charles Dow, co-founder of Dow Jones & Company, as part of the Customer's Afternoon Letter. From its inception (until May 26, 1896), the Dow Jones Transportation Average consisted of eleven transportation-related companies: nine railroads and two non-rail companies (Western Union and Pacific Mail).

April 9, 1894

January 2, 1886

February 16, 1885

July 3, 1884

References

External links 
Dow Jones Industrial Average Historical Components through 2015

Dow Jones Industrial Average